Louis Sanmarco (April 7, 1912 – October 9, 2009) was a French colonial administrator of Italian origin.  He served as the governor of the colony of Ubangi-Shari from 1954 until 1957, and served as Governor of Gabon from 29 January 1958 to 28 November 1958. As Governor of Gabon, he pushed for the incorporation of Gabon into France as an overseas department. He then served as High Commissioner of Gabon from 1958 to 1959. He was born in Martigues and died in Paris.

References
Rulers.org

1912 births
2009 deaths
French colonial governors and administrators
Governors of Ubangi-Shari
People from Martigues
French people of Italian descent